David Humphreys (July 10, 1752 – February 21, 1818) was an American Revolutionary War colonel and aide de camp to George Washington, a secretary and intelligence agent for Benjamin Franklin in Paris, American minister to Portugal and then to Spain, entrepreneur who brought Merino sheep to America and member of the Connecticut state legislature. A poet and author, he was one of the "Hartford Wits."

Early life
He was born in what was then Derby, Connecticut, and now a part of the neighboring town of Ansonia, in the First Congregational Church parsonage, a spacious two-story house at 37 Elm St. called the David Humphreys House. He was the youngest of five children (four sons and a daughter) of Daniel and Sarah Riggs Bowers Humphreys. Humphreys' father was parson of the church from 1733, the year after he graduated from Yale, to 1787—a run of 54 years. Daniel Humphreys was the second husband of Sarah Riggs Bowers, known in Derby as "Lady Humphreys" for her "dignity and refinement of character," according to author Leo T. Molloy.

As a boy, Humphreys was passionately fond of books. His father prepared both him and his brother, Daniel, for his own alma mater, Yale College, and entered both of them there. David was 15 years old when he entered the school and 19 when he graduated in 1771 with distinguished honors. While at Yale, he founded the Brothers in Unity, a debating society which came to prominence in the 1800s. Among his college friends were Timothy Dwight IV, who later became one of Yale's great presidents; John Trumbull, poet and lawyer (not the artist); and Joel Barlow, poet and diplomat.

After graduation, Humphreys became principal at the public school in Wethersfield, Connecticut for two years. He then worked as a tutor for the youngest of the 11 children of Col. Frederick Philipse at the Philipse Manor house in what is now Yonkers, New York.

Philipse was a prominent and outspoken Tory—which only roused the tutor's Patriot leanings. In 1774 Humphreys returned to New Haven, received a master of arts degree from Yale and was offered a position as an instructor, which he refused. He instead taught part-time at a private school run by his brother, Daniel, in New Haven. (Two contemporaries who also taught school in their early careers were John Adams and Nathan Hale.)

American Revolutionary War

In July 1776, Humphreys enlisted in the Continental Army as a volunteer adjutant in the 2nd Connecticut Regiment, then stationed in New York. The regiment consisted of several companies of "Derby men". He later saw action in the battle following the burning of Danbury, Connecticut and in a later raid on Sag Harbor, New York.

In that raid the Americans captured 90 prisoners, destroyed 12 enemy brigs and sloops, an armed vessel and an enormous quantity of stores, and returned to Connecticut without the loss of a single soldier. Humphreys was detailed to report the success directly to General Washington in New Jersey. It was probably the first meeting between the two.

Humphreys was promoted to captain and major. He served on the staffs of General Parsons, Israel Putnam and Nathanael Greene. On June 23, 1780, Humphreys was appointed aide-de-camp of Washington's headquarters staff, and he became a confidential friend and adviser to the general.

After the Battle of Yorktown, Washington entrusted the surrendered British colors, along with the general's report on the battle, to Humphreys and Tench Tilghman, a fellow aide who also delivered word of the Patriot victory to Congress.  A painting of Humphreys arriving with them, titled "The Delivery of the Standards' to the Continental Congress in Philadelphia, November, 1781," now hangs at the headquarters of the New Haven Museum and Historical Society, which also has a ceremonial sword that Congress voted be presented to Humphreys. The sword was presented in 1786 by Gen. Henry Knox. Humphreys was also commissioned a lieutenant-colonel, with his commission backdated to his appointment as an aide to Washington.

When Washington resigned his commission and presented himself before Congress, Humphreys was one of two aides who accompanied him into the chamber (the other was Benjamin Walker). Humphreys then traveled with Washington and Martha Washington back to Mount Vernon. Washington later recommended to Congress that it appoint Humphreys secretary of foreign affairs (the appointment went to John Jay instead).

After the war, Humphreys became an Original Member of the Connecticut Society of the Cincinnati.

Public service

Humphreys was appointed to a commission to negotiate treaties of commerce with European nations. Other members of the commission were John Adams, Thomas Jefferson and Benjamin Franklin. He became Franklin's secretary in 1784 in Paris, where he acted as an intelligence agent as well, and continued as a secretary to the legation under the Jefferson ministry.

In a letter of introduction to Franklin, Washington described Humphreys: "This gentleman was several years in my family as aide-de-camp -- his zeal in the cause of his country -- his good sense, prudence and attachment to me, rendered him dear to me; and I persuade myself you will find no confidence which you may think proper to repose in him, misplaced. He possesses an excellent heart, good natural and acquired abilities and -- sterling integrity -- to which may be added sobriety and an obliging disposition."

In 1786, Humphreys was elected to the October session of the Connecticut General Assembly. He was appointed head of the state militia and marched to West Springfield, Massachusetts to help deal with the civil strife and tumult of Shays' Rebellion, but by the time he had arrived, Massachusetts authorities were already in control of the situation.

In 1787 his mother died on July 27 and his father on September 2. At Washington's invitation, Humphreys stayed at Mount Vernon during the 1780s, acting as the general's private secretary and managing his correspondence. When Washington, elected president, took the oath of office in New York City, Humphreys accompanied him on the trip from Virginia and stood beside him during the ceremony.  Humphreys acted as a speechwriter to Washington, helping add flourish to his speeches and correspondences before and during the presidency.

In 1791, Humphreys had the distinction of being the first minister appointed to a foreign country under the Constitution, when he was appointed minister to Portugal, the first neutral country to recognize the United States. In that post he negotiated the ransomed release of American prisoners from the Dey of Tripoli.

In 1796 he was appointed as minister to Spain, which then controlled the Mississippi River and all of Latin America except for Brazil. John Quincy Adams succeeded him in Lisbon. He remained minister to Spain until 1801, and during his stay there met and married Anne Frances Bulkeley, a cultured and wealthy English woman. Her father, John Bulkeley, was a banker, merchant and trader. In 1804, Humphreys was elected as a member to the American Philosophical Society in Philadelphia.

He served again as a member of the Connecticut state house of representatives, from 1812 to 1814. He was elected a Fellow of the Royal Society of London in June 1807. In 1813, Humphreys was also elected a member of the American Antiquarian Society.

Entrepreneur

The couple moved to Boston, where they bought a home on Chestnut Street on Beacon Hill and "entertained lavishly." But Humphreys bought a farm in Derby and managed to spend considerable time there. He also bought a factory and house in what is now Seymour, Connecticut that produced scythes and other iron tools. For a time, the community was called "Humphreysville."

Having seen poor conditions in mills in England, he was determined to avoid a similar situation in his Rimmons Falls plant in Seymour. He took in many boys from New York City at the mill, training, educating and clothing them. Humphreys established evening and Sunday schools for the boys and organized them into a uniformed military company which he drilled personally.

"It was largely through his efforts that the state inaugurated its efforts at factory inspection," according to Leo Molloy.

As a farmer, he was actively interested in agricultural improvements, and his farm became an experimental station. He helped found the Agriculture Society of Connecticut and became its first president.

Merino sheep

In 1802, Humphreys bought a herd of merino sheep in Spain and had them imported directly to Derby. Out of 25 rams and 75 ewes, five rams and two ewes died in the passage. They attracted a good deal of attention in town. "Humphreys considered their fleece of a superior quality and believed that their mixture with American sheep would eventually result in the production, through manufacture, of finer fabrics in America."

He sold some of the sheep, which then were resold in a flurry of speculation. He set up the first successful woollen mill factory in the new country, and it quickly achieved the reputation as the best producer of broadcloth in the United States. Coats made from the "golden fleece" were worn by President Thomas Jefferson, James Madison and Captain Isaac Hull. Humphreys "is regarded as the founder of the woollen industry" in America.

Poet and author

Humphreys is credited with composing the first American sonnet in 1776 with the title "Addressed to my Friends at Yale College, on my Leaving them to join the Army", but his most popular work was written in 1785, Happiness of America, which went to 10 editions in print between 1786 and1804.

Humphreys enjoyed writing and had a voluminous correspondence with Washington, now in the Library of Congress. He also wrote for the public and was the author of a "Life of General Israel Putnam," whose staff he served on. He was one of the writers called the Hartford Wits (the others were Joel Barlow, Timothy Dwight IV, John Trumbull and Lemuel Hopkins) and coauthored The Anarchiad, a satirical poem that reflected Humphreys' Federalist Party bent. In 1802, he wrote an anti-slavery poem entitled A Poem on the Industry of the United States of America. He was elected a Fellow of the American Academy of Arts and Sciences in 1804.

In 1786, Humphreys wrote an account of the controversial confinement and proposed execution of British Captain Charles Asgill for the New-Haven Gazette. The article, consisting of Washington's official papers on the affair, was published posthumously, in 1859, in book form, as The conduct of General Washington : respecting the confinement of Capt. Asgill, placed in its true point of light.

His play The Yankey in England (c. 1814) was extremely influential in forging the stage character of the Yankee (often singing Yankee Doodle) that came to dominate American and English comedies in the period up to 1850, and comes with a seven-page glossary of the "peculiar idiom and pronunciation" of Americanisms, which is an important source for American historical dialectology.

Last years

He died in his room at Butler's Tavern, in New Haven, Connecticut, where he stayed when he was attending to affairs in Derby, and was interred at Grove Street Cemetery.

See also

David Humphreys House
List of the oldest buildings in Connecticut

Sources

External links

Humphreys House , now a museum
Society of the Cincinnati
The American Revolution Institute

Gallery 

1752 births
1818 deaths
People from Derby, Connecticut
Yale University alumni
Ambassadors of the United States to Portugal
Ambassadors of the United States to Spain
Continental Army officers from Connecticut
American people of Welsh descent
Fellows of the American Academy of Arts and Sciences
Members of the American Antiquarian Society
Fellows of the Royal Society
Burials at Grove Street Cemetery
18th-century American diplomats
19th-century American diplomats
People of colonial Connecticut
Military personnel from Connecticut
Speechwriters for presidents of the United States
Aides-de-camp of George Washington
Hartford Wits